Madame Grand is a 1783 oil-on-canvas painting by the French artist Louise Élisabeth Vigée Le Brun. It is in the collection of the Metropolitan Museum of Art, in New York.

Early history and creation
The work is signed and dated 1783. It was exhibited by Louise Élisabeth Vigée Le Brun in the Académie royale de peinture et de sculpture Salon of 1783 as number 117.

Description and interpretation
The painting is in oval format and depicts Madame Grand who was born in India. She later became the wife of the minister and diplomat Talleyrand. In her hand she holds a musical score.

Later history and influence
The work has been exhibited in a variety of shows in more recent history, including the 1939 New York World's Fair in the "Masterpieces of Art: European Paintings and Sculpture from 1300–1800" show, at the Grand Palais, Paris in 1974–1975 in the show "De David à Delacroix: La peinture française de 1774 à 1830", and at the Kimbell Art Museum in Fort Worth, Texas in an "Elisabeth Louise Vigée Le Brun" show in 1982. The painting is currently part of the Metropolitan Museum of Art's collections.

References

Metropolitan Museum of Art 2017 drafts
Paintings in the collection of the Metropolitan Museum of Art
Portraits of women
1783 paintings
Paintings by Élisabeth Vigée Le Brun